MMM (Money Making Mitch) is the first mixtape by Puff Daddy & The Family, originally released on November 4, 2015 as a free mixtape on Bad Boy Records and Epic Records. It was later re-released on iTunes as a retail album on December 18, 2015. It serves as the lead-up to Daddy's studio album No Way Out 2, the sequel to Daddy's debut album No Way Out (1997). It features guest appearances from hip hop artists Big Sean, French Montana, Future, Jadakiss, Lil' Kim, Pusha T, Styles P, Travis Scott, Ty Dolla Sign, Wiz Khalifa and more. It also features production from Puff Daddy himself, 88-Keys, Ayo, D'Mile, Don P, Harry Fraud, Hollywood Hot Sauce, Honorable C.N.O.T.E., Keyz, Kuk Harrell, Mario Winans, Mike WiLL Made-It, Nashiem Myrick, P-Nasty, Puff Daddy, Rob Holladay, Sean C & LV, Smash David and Stevie J.

Release
Money Making Mitch was made available for free digital download on Diddy's 46th birthday via mixtape hosting site DatPiff and to stream on Spotify and Bad Boy Entertainment's SoundCloud account, originally in an edited form.

Critical reception

MMM was met with generally positive reviews upon release. HipHopDX believed that the mixtape was traditionally Puff Daddy, showcasing "mostly all the traditional elements we know and love about Daddy’s music but runs into a bit of an identity crisis."

Track listing

Track notes
  signifies a co-producer.
  signifies an additional producer.
 "Facts" features background vocals from Erin Sanderson.
 "Help Me" contains elements from "Pensieri", performed by Fred Bongusto.
 "Blow a Check" is a remix of Zoey Dollaz's song "Blow a Check.

Charts

Weekly charts

References

Sean Combs albums
Concept albums
2015 mixtape albums
Bad Boy Records albums
Albums produced by Mike Will Made It
Albums produced by Key Wane
Albums produced by Hit-Boy
Albums produced by Sean Combs
Albums produced by Nard & B
Albums produced by Harry Fraud